The Château Sainte-Marie is a castle dating from the second half of the 16th century, modified and altered during the 19th century, in the commune of Longages in the Haute-Garonne département of France.

Privately owned, it has been listed since 1984 as a monument historique by the French Ministry of Culture.

See also
List of castles in France

References

External links
 
 

Castles in Haute-Garonne
Monuments historiques of Haute-Garonne